David Charles Oldfield (born 30 May 1968) is an English former professional footballer who played for several English clubs including Luton Town, Manchester City, Leicester City and Stoke City. He was recently manager of National League South club Weymouth, but left the club by mutual consent on 14 September 2022

Playing career
Born in Australia, Oldfield moved to England with his family at a young age. He began playing football as a boy for North Buckinghamshire Village side Stoke Goldington, before being spotted by league outfit Luton Town in 1986, where he played 29 league games over the next three years, scoring four goals. While at Luton he received a call-up to the England under-21 squad, in March 1988.

Oldfield moved to Manchester City for a fee of £600,000 in March 1989, choosing to join City ahead of West Ham United. At City, Oldfield formed part of the squad that gained promotion to the First Division in 1988–89. Though Oldfield was at Maine Road for less than a year, he is fondly remembered for his two goals in the Manchester derby against local rivals United in September 1989 when City triumphed 5–1. Mel Machin, the manager who signed Oldfield for City, was sacked in November 1989. Less than a month after Howard Kendall was appointed as Machin's successor, Oldfield was sold. In an exchange valued at £650,000, Oldfield headed to Leicester City, and Wayne Clarke travelled in the opposite direction.

Oldfield stayed at Leicester for five years. He helped them win promotion to the FA Premier League in 1994, winning the playoffs at Wembley after losing there in the two previous seasons. He then had a successful loan spell at Millwall, but the move was not made permanent and he returned to Luton Town instead. However, he was unable to prevent their relegation to Division Two in 1996 and signed for Stoke City two years later. He spent two years with Stoke before a two-year spell at Peterborough United and then a two-year spell at Oxford United before he played his last professional game in 2004. He came out of retirement the following year to sign for non-league Stafford Rangers, where he spent two years. Tamworth confirmed the signing of David Oldfield on 30 November 2007. Oldfield made his debut for the club against Leigh RMI in a 2–0 home victory on 1 December 2007, just one day after signing.

Managerial career
Oldfield was named as Oxford caretaker-manager after the dismissal of Ian Atkins in March 2004 but his first game in charge was postponed due to bad weather and Graham Rix was appointed before the next; Oldfield finally took charge of Oxford as caretaker-manager for one game (a home defeat to Chester City) before the appointment of Brian Talbot in May 2005. He left Oxford's backroom staff in 2006.

Some three days after Oldfield made his Tamworth debut, he was appointed as the new first team manager of Brackley Town on 4 December 2007, replacing Roger Ashby. In 2008 Oldfield was appointed as Reserve Team Manager at Peterborough United, and on 11 January 2011 he took charge of the first team for one match in between the departure of manager Gary Johnson and the appointment of Darren Ferguson as his replacement, a 2–1 home league win over Brentford.

In July 2011, Oldfield left Peterborough to join West Bromwich Albion as a development coach. On 12 June 2014, Oldfield joined Milton Keynes Dons as Head of Academy Coaching He was appointed assistant manager to Jimmy Floyd Hasselbaink at Burton Albion in November 2014. On 4 December 2015, Oldfield left Burton to join Hasselbaink at Queens Park Rangers.

Towards the end of the 2016–17 season Oldfield returned to Peterborough United on a trial basis after the departure of Lee Glover. At the end of the season he was appointed as assistant manager on a permanent basis under manager Grant McCann. He stepped in as caretaker-manager for one game in February 2018 after McCann's sacking (a 2–1 home victory over Walsall) before Steve Evans was appointed. Oldfield left the club the following month.

Oldfield was appointed manager of Oxford City F.C. in March 2020.

On 18 January 2022, he moved up a division to be appointed manager of National League side Weymouth, leaving Oxford City in fourth position in the National League South table. he left the club by mutual consent on 14 September 2022

Career statistics
Source:

A.  The "Other" column constitutes appearances and goals in the Anglo-Italian Cup, Football League Trophy, Football League play-offs and Full Members Cup.

References

External links
 

1978 births
Living people
Soccer players from Perth, Western Australia
People educated at Ousedale School
Australian soccer players
Australian people of English descent
Australian expatriate soccer players
English footballers
England under-21 international footballers
Association football midfielders
Luton Town F.C. players
Manchester City F.C. players
Leicester City F.C. players
Millwall F.C. players
Stoke City F.C. players
Peterborough United F.C. players
Oxford United F.C. players
Oxford United F.C. managers
Stafford Rangers F.C. players
Tamworth F.C. players
Brackley Town F.C. players
National League (English football) players
English Football League players
Premier League players
Association football coaches
Peterborough United F.C. non-playing staff
West Bromwich Albion F.C. non-playing staff
Milton Keynes Dons F.C. non-playing staff
Burton Albion F.C. non-playing staff
Queens Park Rangers F.C. non-playing staff
Brackley Town F.C. managers
English football managers
Oxford City F.C. managers
Weymouth F.C. managers
Footballers from Buckinghamshire